The 1976 Tasmanian state election was held on 11 December 1976.

Retiring Members

Labor
Joseph Britton MHA (Braddon)
Mac Le Fevre MHA (Bass)
Sydney Ward MHA (Braddon)

Liberal
Wilfred Barker MHA (Braddon)

House of Assembly
Sitting members are shown in bold text. Tickets that elected at least one MHA are highlighted in the relevant colour. Successful candidates are indicated by an asterisk (*).

Bass
Seven seats were up for election. The Labor Party was defending four seats. The Liberal Party was defending three seats.

Braddon
Seven seats were up for election. The Labor Party was defending five seats. The Liberal Party was defending two seats.

Denison
Seven seats were up for election. The Labor Party was defending four seats. The Liberal Party was defending three seats.

Franklin
Seven seats were up for election. The Labor Party was defending four seats. The Liberal Party was defending three seats.

Wilmot
Seven seats were up for election. The Labor Party was defending four seats. The Liberal Party was defending three seats.

See also
 Members of the Tasmanian House of Assembly, 1972–1976
 Members of the Tasmanian House of Assembly, 1976–1979

References
Tasmanian Parliamentary Library

Candidates for Tasmanian state elections